Congress Shall Make No Law... is an album by Frank Zappa, released posthumously in 2010 by the Zappa Family Trust on Zappa Records. It contains a full recording of Zappa's September 19, 1985, testimony before the United States Senate Committee on Commerce, Science and Transportation, during which he spoke in support of the recording industry and against censorship. In his testimony, Zappa criticized the Parents Music Resource Center, formed in 1985 with the stated goal of increasing parental control over the access of children to recordings deemed to have violent, drug-related or sexual themes by labeling them with Parental Advisory stickers. The album's release commemorates the 25th anniversary of the hearings.

The album's title refers to the First Amendment to the United States Constitution, which states,
"Congress shall make no law respecting an establishment of religion, or prohibiting the free exercise thereof; or abridging the freedom of speech, or of the press; or the right of the people peaceably to assemble, and to petition the government for a redress of grievances."

In a press release, Gail Zappa said of the album,
"'Congress Shall Make No Law...' is released as an educational project, representing Zappa's tireless commitment to the First Amendment which he felt his duty to protect by providing (in his words) "stimulating digital audio entertainment" in the form of "material which a truly free society would neither fear nor suppress."

Congress Shall Make No Law... also includes Zappa testimony before the Maryland State Legislature the following year, as well as various quotes and interview excerpts on the subject of censorship and an alternate version of the song "Reagan at Bitburg", one of the last pieces Zappa finished before his death in 1993. The first official version of the track was included on the 1994 album, Civilization Phaze III. Many of the tracks are named after the Ten Commandments, each corresponding to the particular topic of Zappa's opinion.

Track listing

References

External links 
 
 Congress Shall Make No Law... album at Discogs.com

2010 compilation albums
Frank Zappa compilation albums
Compilation albums published posthumously
Zappa Records albums
Articles containing video clips
Spoken word albums by American artists
Live spoken word albums
2010s spoken word albums